Belle Haleine, Eau de Voilette (Beautiful Breath, Veil Water) is a work of art by Marcel Duchamp, with the assistance of Man Ray. First conceived in 1920, created spring of 1921, Belle Haleine is one of the Readymades of Marcel Duchamp, or more specifically a rectified ready-made.

A photograph of the object, by Man Ray, was reproduced on the cover of New York Dada magazine in April 1921. This "readymade" consisted of a Rigaud brand perfume bottle with a modified label. It involved taking a mundane, utilitarian object, not generally considered to be art, and transforming it by adding a reworked label. 

In 2009, Belle Haleine, Eau de voilette became the most expensive Duchamp piece ever sold at auction when it brought in $11,500,000 (€8,913,000) at Christie's in Paris. Previously, an artist's multiple of Duchamp's famed Fountain owned by Arturo Schwarz held the record, selling for $1,762,500 on November 17, 1999 at Sotheby's in New York.

Overview

Duchamp removed the label from a  bottle, then proceeded, with Man Ray, to alter the object in several ways. The new label was specifically created by the two artists for the Rigaud bottle. For this reason Belle Haleine, Eau de Voilette is often referred to as an 'assisted readymade'. The model on the label is Rrose Sélavy, an alter ego of Marcel Duchamp and one of his pseudonyms. Sélavy emerged in 1921, on this label, for the first time, though the name was first used to sign a readymade, Fresh Widow, in 1920. Man Ray continued a series of photographs showing Duchamp dressed as a woman through the 1920s. Duchamp later used the name as the byline on written material and signed Rrose Sélavy on several works. The ambiguity of Duchamp in drag is not dissimilar to the image of the Mona Lisa with a goatee and mustache in Duchamp's L.H.O.O.Q. (1919). Mona Lisa became a man, and Duchamp became a woman.

The original label on the Rigaud bottle read "Un air embaumé" (meaning perfumed air, or embalmed air), "Eau de Violette" (or Violet Water). By swapping positions of the "i" and "o" Duchamp and Man Ray obtained "Eau de Voilette" (meaning Veil Water). "Un air embaumé" was replaced with the unapologetic "Belle Haleine" (or "Beautiful Breath"). The "R" for Rigaud became "RS" for Rrose Sélavy.

The object touches on several issues; authorship, since the label is by Rigaud, Duchamp and Man Ray; gender identity or sexual orientation, as the woman's perfume now has a Duchamp as its principle image. Further sexual connotations arise due to suggestions of smell, touch, and taste intrinsic to the piece.

Shortly after its inception, Duchamp gave the bottle to Yvonne Chastel-Crotti, the ex-wife of Jean Crotti (who eventually married Suzanne Duchamp). Yvonne Crotti kept it throughout her lifetime. The first exhibition within which Belle Haleine appeared was organized by the Cordier & Ekstrom Gallery, New York City, in 1965; though a larger collage version of the label was shown in 1930, at Galerie Goemans in Paris.

The title uses the feminine noun "haleine", which from the French language translates into 'breath', specifying the psychic content (from the Greek psykhḗ,  'vital breath'). However, the two cities indicated on the label suggest the adoption of both languages. If "Haleine" is pronounced in a mixture of French and American it would have vague vowel similarity to “Hélène", in English “Helen”. The paraphony is suggested by the association with the adjective "Belle". The name is that of the daughter of Leda (Euripides, Helen, Prologue, v. 133), who was considered in Greek mythology to be the embodiment of ideal beauty and grace, praised in every age. The title of the ready-made would follow that of Jacques Offenbach, La Belle Hélène, a comic opera in three acts, set in Sparta (first performance: Paris, Théâtre des Varieétés, December 17, 1864). It is linked to a parodic tradition of the Homeric legend of Helen. The heroine "Mariée au peu ardent Ménelas", in the finale runs away with her lover, "Pâris" (text by Henri and Ludovic Halévy). The American Man Ray would have participated in the work, 'capturing' the photographic image, like Paris, author of the legendary capture of Helen. Elsewhere Duchamp has already played on the “double meaning of Paris like Paris [city] and Paris [in gr. Páris]”.  
«Presumably, Duchamp drew the greatest ideas for his work from the reading of the tragedy of Euripides Helen, in which a different plot is carried out. [...] In the Prologue of the tragedy, set in Egypt, the protagonist dissociates herself from the current Homeric version, in revealing herself that, following the judgment of Paris, the goddess Hera, as a prize, did not give him Helen in person, "but a living image”, made in his “created likeness with celestial matter” («eídōlon émpnoun ouranoũ», Euripides, Helen, vv. 33-34). Her clarification was intended to dispel any suspicion of ubiquity and remedy her "shameful reputation" (Ib., v. 135)». After clarifying the distinction between image and body (“eikṑn”, “sōma”, Ib., v. 588), the double of Helen ("eidōlon", Ib., v. 582) "flew into the depths of the ether and disappeared" (Helen, v. 605). Eau de Voilette met the same fate. The scent-bottle, exhibited at the historic Duchamp exhibition in Venice (Palazzo Grassi 1993), appeared empty. Only air remained inside. However, since every form wants its content, the same spirit  could be locked up again in the perfume bottle along with the same humor as Duchamp,   who revealed it (made it manifest) from the very moment he concealed it with an artifice. He was hidden under a thin veil (“Voilette”). Any observer is able to do this, according to Duchamp's poetics.

References

Further reading
 M. Duchamp and M. Ray, in New York Dada, no. 1, 1921* R. Lebel, Sur Marcel Duchamp, Paris, 1959, p. 170, no. 149
 A. Schwarz, The Complete Works of Marcel Duchamp, Londres, 1969, p. 310, no. 123
 A. Schwarz, Documenti e periodici Dada, in Archivi d'arte del XX secolo, 1970
 A. Schwarz, Marcel Duchamp, 66 Creative Years from the First Painting to the Last Drawing, Paris, 1972, p. 40, no. 93
 Ubrigens Sterben immer die Anderen: Marcel Duchamp und die Avantgarde seit 1950, exhibition catalogue, Cologne, Museum Ludwig, 1988, p. 61
 M. Duchamp and E. Bonk, Marcel Duchamp, The Portable Museum, Londres, 1989, p. 247
 P. Hulten, J. Gough-Cooper and J. Caumont, Marcel Duchamp: Work and Life, Milan, 1993, p. 80
 F.M. Naumann, New York Dada, 1915-23, New York, 1994, pp. 52, 54
 B. Adams, The Age of Modernism: Art in the 20th century, exhibition catalogue, Berlin, The Martin-Gropius-Bau, 1997, p. 319
 A. Schwarz, The Complete Works of Marcel Duchamp, New York, 1997, vol. II, p. 688, no. 388
 B.J. Garner, "Duchamp Bottles Belle Greene: Just Desserts for his Canning", in Tout-Fait, no. 2, vol. 1, 2000
 S.J. Gould, "From the Bitter Negro Pun to the Beautiful Breath Bottle", in Tout-Fait, no. 2, vol. 1, 2000
 J. Mink, Duchamp 1887-1968: L'art contre l'art, Paris, 2001, p. 80
 B. Bailey, Duchamp's Chess Identity: 1917-1923, Cleveland, 2004, p. 107, no. 28* Saõ Paulo, Museu de Arte Moderna and Buenos Aires, Fundacion Proa, Marcel Duchamp: Uma obra que no uma obra "de arte", juin 2007-février 2009

External links
 Pierre Cabanne, Dialogues with Marcel Duchamp, New York, 1971, p. 64, full text online.
 Belle Haleine, Eau de Voilette (Beautiful Breath, Veil Water), Gelatin silver print, Philadelphia Museum of Art

Marcel Duchamp works
1921 works
Parodies of advertising
Found object
Perfumes